Broadside is the fourth full album by Bellowhead, released on 15 October 2012.

The album was recorded over several weeks at Rockfield Studios in March 2012. Initially around 25 tracks were arranged for the album, of these 14 tracks were recorded (all of which became commercially available). Like their previous album, Hedonism, it was produced by John Leckie.

All of the tracks, bar one, on Broadside are traditional folk songs, many being written several hundred years ago; they have all been given a new arrangement by the band. The album title refers both to the nautical meaning of firepower and to broadside ballads, an early form of printed song.

The album entered the UK official album charts at number 16, unprecedented for an independently released folk album. It also went to number 1 in the UK independent album charts.

Singles

The track, "10,000 Miles Away", was released as the lead single in late September and was playlisted on BBC Radio 2 for several weeks in October. In January, the album's second single "Roll the Woodpile Down" (Radio Edit), was also playlisted on the 'A list' for BBC Radio 2, receiving significant airplay. This radio edit was mixed by Pete Craigie (Pet Shop Boys).

Track listing

Bonus tracks

Both bonus tracks appear on the iTunes 'bonus track edition'. "Wind & Rain" also appears on the single 10,000 Miles Away.

Personnel
Jon Boden - lead vocals, fiddle
Benji Kirkpatrick - guitars, bouzouki, mandolin, banjo, vocals
John Spiers - melodeon, Anglo-concertina, Claviola, vocals
Andy Mellon - trumpet, vocals
Justin Thurgur - trombone, vocals
Brendan Kelly - saxophone, bass clarinet, vocals
Ed Neuhauser - Helicon, Tuba, vocals
Pete Flood - percussion, vocals
Rachael McShane - cello, fiddle, vocals
Paul Sartin - fiddle, oboe, vocals
Sam Sweeney - fiddle, English bagpipes, vocals

References

Bellowhead albums
2012 albums
Albums recorded at Rockfield Studios